İzmir derbisi is the name given to football matches between Göztepe and Karşıyaka S.K., both of them from İzmir, Turkey. When the two teams played on May 16, 1981 while pursuing the Turkish Second Division title, the game attracted an audience of 80,000 people. The Guinness Book of World Records recognizes this milestone as a world record for a Second Division football game and The Guardian published an article named "The biggest non-top-flight attendance ever" including this match.

Honours

All Time Statistics
As of 28 March 2020

All Matches 

{|
|valign="top" width=33%|

References

Göztepe S.K.
Karşıyaka S.K.
Turkey football rivalries